Garden furniture, also called patio furniture or outdoor furniture, is a type of furniture specifically designed for outdoor use.  It is typically made of weather-resistant materials such as aluminium which is rust-proof.

History
The oldest surviving examples of garden furniture were found in the gardens of Pompeii. Around 1840, Janes, Beebe & Co. produced one of the earliest products of mass-produced cast-iron seating manufacture in America.

Types of furniture

Wooden furniture
Bamboo furniture
Wicker or rattan furniture
Metal furniture
Plastic furniture
Glass furniture
Table
Rope furniture

Seating 
Garden furniture is often sold as a patio set consisting of a table, four or six chairs, and a parasol.  A picnic table is used for the purpose of eating a meal outdoors. Long chairs, referred to as chaise longue, are also common items. Recently seating furniture has been used for conversation areas using items like couches.

Temperature control 

The British 'garden parasol' or American 'garden umbrella' is the term for a specialised type of umbrella designed to provide shade from the sun. Parasols are either secured in a weighted base or a built-in mount in the paving. Some are movable around outdoor tables and seating, others centred through a hole mid-table.

Patio heaters are used to enable people to sit outside at night or in cold weather. They can be permanently mounted on eaves and patio roofs, or portable and self-supporting.  They can operate on electricity, propane, bottled butane (small units), or  natural gas. The latter can be plumbed into permanent locations or attached to 'quick-connect' outlets.

Modular outdoor fire pits and portable fire bowls have become widely available in many materials to extend outdoor living. The tall clay Chimeneas of North America are an example.

Accessories 
Current garden accessories include items like birdbaths, plant stands, planter boxes and trellises to add detail to an outdoor space.

Materials

The most commonly sold types of patio sets are made of plastic, wood, aluminium, wicker, and wrought iron.

Wooden garden furniture can suffer through exposure to the elements and therefore needs to be periodically treated. Teak is a commonly used material for outdoor furniture. It naturally contains silica, which makes it resistant to fungal decay, many of the effects of water (such as rot, swelling and warping), as well as chemicals.  It is also resistant to fire, acid and alkalis. 

When teak weathers it loses its original look but gains a majestic, almost silver glow. Many owners prefer the aged look of teak and because of its resistance to rotting and infestation, it can be appreciated without upkeep.
Aluminium garden furniture is robust and long-lasting. However, if the protective coating is compromised it will corrode. Plastic garden furniture is naturally waterproof, so it can be left out year-round. Waterproof outdoor furniture pieces are usually made of materials such as Mahogany, Teak, Cast Aluminum, PE Wicker, Plastic and PVC Wicker. These materials are durable and can withstand the elements of wind, rain and sun exposure.

Wicker outdoor living furniture was originally made from the stems of any one of 600 species of palms found in tropical regions all over the world.  The palm stems were tightly woven into interlocking panels, and formed into the desired structure. Now, most modern wicker furniture is made from synthetic resin, increasing the life expectancy and reducing manufacturing costs. Today's resin furniture is often made of recycled plastic and incredibly durable, usually carrying warranties of 20 years or longer. It can be moulded to resemble real wood or wicker.

See also

 Courtyard
 Deck (building)
 Garden
 Patio

References

Furniture
Furniture, Garden